Ajayanum Vijayanum is a 1976 Indian Malayalam-language film,  directed by J. Sasikumar and produced by K. N. S. Jaffarsha. The film stars Prem Nazir, Lakshmi, Sukumari, Kaviyoor Ponnamma and Adoor Bhasi. The film has musical score by M. S. Viswanathan. The movie is a remake of the 1964 Telugu movie Ramudu Bheemudu.

Cast

Prem Nazir as Ajay/Vijay
Sukumari as Devaki
Kaviyoor Ponnamma as Susheela
Adoor Bhasi as Rajappan
Thikkurissy Sukumaran Nair as Thampi
Lakshmi as Nandini
Sankaradi as Pilla
Sreelatha Namboothiri as Sreekala
Nilambur Balan
Baby Sabitha as Mini
K. P. Ummer as Godhavarma Raja
Kunchan as Kutttan
Meena as Vijayan's mother
Radhika as Kalyani
Surasu
Vidhubala as Radhika

Remakes details at a glance

Soundtrack
The music was composed by M. S. Viswanathan and the lyrics were written by Sreekumaran Thampi.

References

External links
 

1976 films
1970s Malayalam-language films
Films scored by M. S. Viswanathan
Malayalam remakes of Telugu films
Films directed by J. Sasikumar